Aiuchi (written: 愛内 or 相内) is a Japanese surname. Notable people with the surname include:

, Japanese singer and songwriter
, Japanese snowboarder

Japanese-language surnames